Sabine is a surname. Notable people with the surname include:

 Charles Sabine (born 1960), English TV journalist and advocate for patients with degenerative brain disease
 Clement Sabine (1831–1903), pastoralist in South Australia
 David Sabine (born 1966), English cricketer
 Sir Edward Sabine (1788–1883), Irish astronomer, scientist, ornithologist and explorer
 Elizabeth Juliana Leeves Sabine (1807–1879), British translator of Alexander von Humboldt's Kosmos and assistant of her husband Sir Edward Sabine in his scientific work
 Elizabeth Sabine (born 1923), Australian voice coach
 George Holland Sabine (1880–1961), American professor and author of philosophy
 Joseph Sabine (1770–1837), English lawyer and naturalist
 Joseph Sabine (British Army officer) (c. 1661–1739), British general and Member of Parliament
 Lorenzo Sabine (1803–1877), U.S. Representative from Massachusetts
 Paul Earls Sabine (1879–1958), American acoustic engineer
 Roy Sabine, English rugby union and rugby league footballer of the 1950s and 1960s, and rugby league coach of the 1970s
 Thierry Sabine, (1949–1986), French motorcycle racer and organiser of the Paris-Dakar rally raid
 Wallace Clement Sabine (1868–1919), physicist, founded the field of architectural acoustics
 William Sabine (1491–1543), English politician